The Godman is a 1999 Indian Malayalam film, directed by K. Madhu. The film stars Mammootty, Indraja, Murali and Ratheesh in lead roles.

Cast

Awards
Kerala State Film Award for Best Dubbing Artist - Sreeja for Vani Viswanath

References

External links
 

1999 films
1990s Malayalam-language films
Films directed by K. Madhu